Keratosis follicularis spinulosa decalvans  is a rare X-linked disorder described by Siemens in 1926, a disease that begins in infancy with keratosis pilaris localized on the face, then evolves to more diffuse involvement.

An association with SAT1 has been suggested.

See also 
 Keratosis follicularis
 Hermann Werner Siemens
 Cicatricial alopecia
 List of cutaneous conditions

References

External links 

Genodermatoses